The Iași Institute of Archaeology (abbreviation: IAI) is an institution of research in the field of archaeology under the auspices of the Romanian Academy. The institute was founded in 1990 in Iași, when the archaeology section of the A.D. Xenopol Institute of History and Archaeology split off.

Directors
 Alexander Rubel (2011–present)
 Victor Spinei (2003-2011)
 Dan G. Teodor (1990-2003)

See also
Romanian Academy
Vasile Pârvan Institute of Archaeology
Institute of Archaeology and Art History, Cluj-Napoca
Romanian Academy in Rome

External links
arheo.ro – Official website

References

Archaeology of Romania
Archaeological research institutes in Romania
Institutes of the Romanian Academy
Anthropological research institutes
Buildings and structures in Iași